Jacob Buehler Snider Jr. (June 17, 1886 – March 15, 1966) was an American politician from Mississippi. Snider served as Mississippi's 23rd Lieutenant Governor from 1936 to 1940 under Governor Hugh L. White.

Biography 
Jacob Buehler Snider, Jr. was born on June 17, 1886, in Grenada, Mississippi. He fought in World War I. Snider represented Tate County in the Mississippi House of Representatives from 1928 to 1932. From 1936 to 1940, Snider served as the Lieutenant Governor of Mississippi. In 1939, Snider unsuccessfully sought the Mississippi Democratic Party's nomination for Governor. Snider died on March 15, 1966, in Pascagoula, Mississippi.

References

Lieutenant Governors of Mississippi
People from Clarksdale, Mississippi
1886 births
1966 deaths
United States Army personnel of World War I
United States Army soldiers
Democratic Party members of the Mississippi House of Representatives
People from Senatobia, Mississippi